Ary de Milde (1634 – 1708) was a Dutch Golden Age ceramist in Delft.

Milde was born in Delft and is known for developing a type of red stoneware imitation teapot that competed with the popular imported Yixing clay teapots. After the war between the Ming Dynasty and the Qing Dynasty the import of Chinese porcelain to the Netherlands was severely reduced after the 1650s and there was an increased market for local ware. Unlike many of his colleagues, Milde actually stamped the bottom of his teapots with his own maker's mark, a practise that did not become common among the Netherlands ceramists until the 18th-century.

Milde died in Delft.

References

 Ary de Milde, Mr. Theepotbacker, by Willem Frederik Karel van Baron Verschuer, Boek-, Kunst- & Handelsdrukkerij v/h Gebroeders Binger, 1916
 Yixng teapot with gold trim sold at Sotheby's June 4th 2008

1634 births
1708 deaths
Artists from Delft
Dutch ceramists